Events in the year 1755 in India.

Deaths
14 February – Raghoji I Bhonsle, Maratha King of Nagpur

Events
National income - ₹9,140 million
The Nizam of Hyderabad (virtually independent of the Moghuls since 1748) cedes the Circars to the French.

References

 
India
Years of the 18th century in India